The Täschhorn (4,491 m) is a mountain in the Pennine Alps in Switzerland, lying south of the Dom within the Mischabel range.

The first ascent of the mountain was by John Llewelyn Davies and J. W. Hayward with guides Stefan and Johann Zumtaugwald and Peter-Josef Summermatter on 30 July 1862.

See also

List of Alpine four-thousanders

External links
 The Täschhorn on SummitPost

Alpine four-thousanders
Mountains of the Alps
Mountains of Valais
Pennine Alps
Mountains of Switzerland
Four-thousanders of Switzerland